Kalyvakia is a village located in the Nicosia District of Cyprus, east of the town of Kythrea. The village is de facto under the control of Northern Cyprus.

References

Communities in Nicosia District
Populated places in Lefkoşa District